La Consolacion University Philippines (LCUP; Filipino: Pamantasang La Consolacion sa Pilipinas) is a private Catholic co-educational basic and higher education institution administered by the Augustinian Sisters of Our Lady of Consolation (ASOLC) in Malolos, Bulacan, Philippines. It was established by the Augustinian Sisters in 1937, originally named Colegio de Nuestra Señora del Carmen. It was later renamed Regina Carmeli College in 1967. 

In December 1997, the Commission on Higher Education granted university status to the school, and it was renamed University of Regina Carmeli (URC). In January 2011, the Augustinian Sisters once again changed the name of the school to La Consolacion University Philippines, in accordance with a congregational decision that all schools being run by the Augustinian Sisters of Our Lady of Consolation in the Philippines carry the name “La Consolacion".

History

Founding 
In May 1937, the Colegio de Nuestra Señora del Carmen was established by five Augustinian sisters. It initially offered early childhood education and elementary courses. In 1967, it was renamed to Regina Carmeli College. The school gained university status from the Commission on Higher Education in December 1997 and was renamed to University of Regina Carmeli.

Recent developments 
In January 2011, the school changed its name to La Consolacion University Philippines after a congregational decision that all schools under operation by the Augustinian Sisters carry one name.

Academics

Colleges 
La Consolacion University Philippines has 6 colleges:

 College of Allied Medical Professions
 College of Medicine
 College of International Tourism and Hospitality Management
 College of Business, Entrepreneurship and Accountancy
 College of Arts, Sciences and Education
 College of Information Technology and Engineering

References

See also
La Consolacion College - Baao, Camarines Sur
La Consolacion College - Bacolod, Negros Occidental
La Consolacion College - Biñan, Laguna
La Consolacion College - Daet, Camarines Norte
La Consolacion College - Iriga, Camarines Sur
La Consolacion College - Manila, Metro Manila
 La Consolacion College - Novaliches, Caloocan, Metro Manila

Universities and colleges in Bulacan
Catholic universities and colleges in the Philippines
Education in Malolos
Catholic elementary schools in the Philippines
Catholic secondary schools in the Philippines
Association of Christian Universities and Colleges in Asia